The 2015 Kettering Borough Council election took place on 7 May 2015 to elect members of Kettering Borough Council in England. It was held on the same day as other local elections. The Conservative Party retained control of the council, which it had held since 2003. The election in Rothwell Ward was delayed until 4 June 2015 due to the death of a candidate.

Results

All Saints Ward (2 seats)

Avondale Grange Ward (2 seats)

Barton Ward (2 seats)

Brambleside Ward (2 seats)

Burton Latimer Ward (3 seats)

Desborough Loatland Ward (2 seats)

Desborough St Giles Ward (2 seats)

Ise Lodge (3 seats)

Northfield Ward (1 seat)

Piper's Hill Ward (2 seats)

Queen Eleanor & Buccleuch Ward (1 seat)

Rothwell (3 seats)

Slade Ward (2 seats)

St Michaels & Wicksteed  Ward (3 seats)

St Peters Ward (2 seats)

Welland Ward (1 seat)

William Knibb Ward (2 seats)

Notes

References

2015 English local elections
May 2015 events in the United Kingdom
2015
2010s in Northamptonshire